Stephen Joseph Stemle (born May 20, 1977) is a former professional baseball player and was a pitcher for the Kansas City Royals. He pitched in 11 major league games over two seasons, and had a career ERA of 8.64.

Stemle played his high school ball at New Albany High School, and collegiately at Western Kentucky University. In 1996, he played collegiate summer baseball with the Chatham A's of the Cape Cod Baseball League. He was selected by the St. Louis Cardinals in the 5th round of the 1998 MLB Draft.

He is now retired due to disk problems in his back and is a pitching coach for Kentucky Country Day School.

See also
List of people from the Louisville metropolitan area

References

External links
Baseball-reference.com page

1977 births
Living people
Kansas City Royals players
Palm Beach Cardinals players
Major League Baseball pitchers
Baseball players from Louisville, Kentucky
Western Kentucky Hilltoppers baseball players
Chatham Anglers players
Memphis Redbirds players
New Haven Ravens players
New Jersey Cardinals players
Omaha Royals players
Peoria Chiefs players
Potomac Cannons players